Sveltia lyrata, common name lyrate nutmeg, is a species of sea snail, a marine gastropod mollusk in the family Cancellariidae, the nutmeg snails.

The genus Sveltia is known in the fossil records from the Paleocene to the Pliocene (age range: from 55.8 to 2.588 million years ago).

Description

Distribution
This species is widespread from Mauritania to South Africa.

References

External links
 Natural History Museum Rotterdam
  Verhecken, A. (2007). Revision of the Cancellariidae (Mollusca, Neogastropoda, Cancellarioidea) of the eastern Atlantic (40°N-40°S) and the Mediterranean. Zoosystema. 29(2): 281–364

Cancellariidae
Gastropods described in 1814
Molluscs of the Atlantic Ocean